Pendant Ridge is a ridge about 3 nautical miles (6 km) long, extending southwest to the north side of the mouth of McGregor Glacier, 1.5 nautical miles (2.8 km) northwest of Simplicity Hill, in the Queen Maud Mountains. So named by the Texas Tech Shackleton Glacier Expedition (1964–65) because a pyramidal peak at its southern extremity appears to be dangling from the ridge as a pendant.

Ridges of the Ross Dependency
Dufek Coast